Édgar Melitón Hernández Cabrera (born 15 October 1982), commonly known as Melitón Hernández, is a Mexican former professional footballer who played as a goalkeeper.

International career
Hernández made his debut for Mexico on March 31, 2015, in a friendly match against Paraguay in a 1–0 win. He played all 90 minutes.

Honours
Pachuca
Mexican Primera División: Clausura 2007
Copa Sudamericana: 2006

Veracruz
Copa MX: Clausura 2016

External links

1982 births
Living people
Liga MX players
C.F. Pachuca players
Club León footballers
C.D. Veracruz footballers
Association football goalkeepers
Footballers from Veracruz
Mexico international footballers
2015 Copa América players
Mexican footballers